Timberline Lake is located in Grand Teton National Park, in the U. S. state of Wyoming. Situated on a high shelf immediately east of Buck Mountain and north of Static Peak, Timberline Lake is one of the highest altitude lakes in Grand Teton National Park.

References

Lakes of Grand Teton National Park